Liaquatabad Town lies in the central part of the city. Liaquatabad Town was formed in 2001 as part of The Local Government Ordinance 2001, and was subdivided into 11 union councils. The town system was disbanded in 2011, but later was restored by the government in early 2022. Also Liaquatabad Town was re-organized as part of Karachi Central District in 2015.

History 
The federal government introduced local government reforms in the year 2000, which eliminated the previous "third tier of government" (administrative divisions) and replaced it with the fourth tier (districts). The effect in Karachi was the dissolution of the former Karachi Division in 2001, and the merging of its five districts to form a new Karachi City-District with eighteen autonomous constituent towns including Liaquatabad Town. In 2011, the system was disbanded but remained in place for bureaucratic administration until 2015, when the Karachi Metropolitan Corporation system was reintroduced. In 2015, Liaquatabad Town was re-organized as part of Karachi Central district.

Neighbourhoods

Important information

Hospitals and dispensaries 
 26 Public/Private Hospitals
 Abbasi Shaheed Hospital
 Sindh Government Hospital
 10 Dispensaries
 Imam Zainul Abedin Hospital

Shopping places and markets 
 Gulbahar Sanitary Market
 Nerang Shopping Centre
 Firdous Shopping Centre
 Gool Market
 Super Market
 Rizvia Market
 Burhan Market
 Azeem Market (Printing Press)
 al hasan chowk
 Multi Chowk
 Baqai heart & cancer hospital
 Imran Hussain
 Taha Garments
 FB Garments
 First Choice
 Golden Arrow
 Khilafat Chowk (Paposh Market)
 ARS LALA Shopping Centre
 Liaquatabad Timber Market

Restaurants 
 Snacks' 786
 Dehli Muslim Kabab House
 Meerath
 Kala Lassi House
 Jeddah biryani
 AA Food Center
 Asim Allah Wala
 Rasheed quorma house
 Mumtaz nehari
 Karachi Fastfood & Biryani center
 Haji mehfooz pakwan house
 Havabite fastfood
 United Fast Food & BAr B Q
 Chicken Bite

Libraries 
 Super Market Library
 Hasrat Mohani Library
 Usmania Library
 Al-Hudda Library
 Nadir Library
 Ghalid Library
 Zain library

Post offices 
 5 Post Offices

Police stations 
 7 Police Stations
PS Liaqatabad
PS shareefabad
PS Super Market
PS Nazimabad
PS Gulbahar
PS Rizvia

Religious places 
 6 Imam Bargah
 6 Mandir
 3 Churches
 3 Jamatkhanas
 Sultanabad Jamatkhana
 Amynabad Jamatkhana
 Nazimabad Jamatkhana
 Aurangabad Junagadh State Sindhi Jamat

Graveyards 
 C 1 Area Graveyard
 Liaquatabad Graveyard
 Khamosh Colony Graveyard
 Khaji Ground Graveyard

Railway station 
 Liaquatabad Railway Station

Katchi Abadies 
 2 Katchi Abadies

See also 
 Karachi Local Government
 Karachi

References

External links 
 Karachi Websites Archived
 Liaquatabad Town Archived

 
Karachi Central District
Towns in Karachi